"Cut Some Rug" / "Castle Rock" is a double A-side single by English indie rock band the Bluetones, released as the third single from their 1996 debut album, Expecting to Fly. The single reached number seven on the UK Singles Chart. Both tracks were also included on the band's 2006 compilation, A Rough Outline: The Singles & B-Sides 95 - 03.

Track listings

UK CD single
 "Cut Some Rug"
 "Castle Rock"
 "The Devil Behind My Smile"

UK 7-inch and cassette single
 "Cut Some Rug"
 "Castle Rock"

Japanese CD single
 "Cut Some Rug"
 "Castle Rock"
 "The Devil Behind My Smile"
 "No.11" (version)

Credits and personnel
Credits are taken from the Expecting to Fly album booklet.

Studio
 Recorded in mid-1995 at Ridge Farm Studios (Surrey, England)

Personnel

 Mark Morriss – writing, vocals
 Eds Chesters – writing, drums, percussion
 Adam Devlin – writing, six-string guitar, twelve-string guitar
 Scott Morriss – writing, vocals, electric bass guitar
 Hugh Jones – production, mixing
 Helen Woodward – mix engineering
 Geoff Pesche – mastering

Charts

References

The Bluetones songs
1996 singles
1996 songs
A&M Records singles
Song recordings produced by Hugh Jones (producer)
Songs written by Adam Devlin
Songs written by Eds Chesters
Songs written by Mark Morriss
Songs written by Scott Morriss